North Carolina Highway 39 (NC 39) is a primary state highway in the U.S. state of North Carolina. Traveling north–south, it connects the cities of Selma, Louisburg and Henderson, in the Research Triangle area.

Route description

NC 39 is a predominantly two-lane rural highway that travels  from US 70, in Selma, to the Virginia state line, north of Townsville.

NC 39 begins as a concurrency along US 301/NC 96, north of US 70. First signs of NC 39 appear alongside US 301/NC 96 through downtown Selma. Within the next , NC 39 splits from both highways as it continues north, through the communities of Hares Crossroads and Emit, before crossing the Johnston–Wake county line.

In Wake County, NC 39 travels  through its easterly tip; overlapping briefly with US 264 Alternate and connecting with mainline US 264, in Zebulon. This entire section is mostly forest, crossing NC 97 halfway through and enters Franklin County at Bunn Lake. Northeast of Bunn Lake, NC 39 crosses over US 64. Continuing north, it goes through the communities of Pilot and Sutton, before reaching NC 98, in Bunn. Through Louisburg, NC 56/NC 581 splits at Nash Street towards Rocky Mount and NC 561 splits at Justice Street towards Centerville. North of Louisburg, in the Ingleside community, US 401 splits towards Warrenton.

NC 39 enters Vance County at Epsom. Going northwesterly, through Gillburg, it enters Henderson city limits near the US 1 interchange. Traveling along Andrews Avenue, it crosses US 1 Business/US 158 Business at Garnett Street, in the downtown area. After crossing over I-85/US 158, it leaves Henderson city limits traveling north. At Harris Crossroads, it meets up with the southwestern edge of Kerr Lake. Continuing north, to the west of Kerr Lake, it travels through the Williamsboro and Townsville communities before ending at the Virginia state line. Before 1952, when John H. Kerr Dam was completed, the road in Virginia would have continued towards Boydton, Virginia; however since then, the road makes a turn southwest, at Richardson, Virginia, and re-enters North Carolina as Townsville Road, eventually ending at US 15.

History
NC 39 was established in 1934 as a partial replacement of NC 23, between Selma and Louisburg, and a complete replacement of NC 501, from Louisburg to the Virginia state line towards Boydton. In 1941, NC 39 was placed on direct routing between Zebulon and Pilot, ending a western overlap along US 264 then northeastern overlap along US 64 to Pilot. Between 1947-1949, NC 39/NC 59 was placed on new bypass east of Louisburg; the old alignment along Main Street was downgraded to secondary road. In 1971, NC 39 was rerouted through downtown Henderson, via Andrews Avenue between Chestnut Street and Witherspoon Avenue; the old alignment, downgraded to secondary roads, was a zig-zag alignment via Cooper Avenue, Chestnut Street, Young Street and Beck Avenue. Around 1992, NC 39 was extended south, along US 301 and then east along a hidden   concurrency with US 70 to its new southern terminus at US 70A; it was originally to replace what remained of US 70A, which was approved for elimination by AASHTO, but was scuttled by local opposition.

North Carolina Highway 501

North Carolina Highway 501 (NC 501) was established in 1929 as primary routing from Henderson to the Virginia Border. Virginia did not have any primary routing that continues into their state from the terminus of NC 501. In 1930 NC 501 was extended further south to Louisburg. In late 1934, NC 501 was renumbered into NC 39, so it would not conflict with US 501.

Major intersections

References

External links

NCRoads.com: N.C. 39
NCRoads.com: N.C. 501

Transportation in Johnston County, North Carolina
Transportation in Wake County, North Carolina
Transportation in Franklin County, North Carolina
Transportation in Vance County, North Carolina
039